"Eve of Destruction" is a protest song written by P. F. Sloan in mid-1965. Several artists have recorded it, but the most popular recording was by Barry McGuire.

The song references social issues of its period, including the Vietnam War, the draft, the threat of nuclear war, the Civil Rights Movement, turmoil in the Middle East, and the American space program.

The American media helped popularize the song by using it as an example of everything that was wrong with the youth of that time. Due to its controversial lyrics, some American radio stations, "claiming it was an aid to the enemy in Vietnam", banned the song. It was also banned by some British radio stations.

Background
The song was offered to the Byrds as a Dylanesque potential single, but they rejected it. The Turtles, another L.A. group which often recorded the Byrds discarded or rejected material, recorded a version instead. The Turtles version was issued as a track on their October 1965 debut album It Ain't Me Babe, shortly after McGuire's version was cut and released in July 1965. The Turtles version was later released as a single in 1970 and hit #100 on the Billboard Hot 100.

Lyrical references
 "You’re old enough to kill, but not for votin refers to the United States law requiring registration for the draft at age 18, while the minimum voting age (in all but four states) was 21, until a Constitutional amendment changed it to 18 in July 1971.
 "And even the Jordan River has bodies floatin refers to The War over Water.
 "If the button is pushed, there's no runnin' away." Refers to the threat of a nuclear war at any moment, and the damage that this would cause.
 The song's mention of Selma, Alabama pertains to the Selma to Montgomery marches and "Bloody Sunday" in March 1965. (The Jan and Dean version substitutes "Watts, California" in the lyrics, in apparent reference to the Watts riots.)
 "You may leave here for four days in space, but when you return it's the same old place" refers to the June 1965 mission of Gemini 4, which lasted just over four days.
 "The pounding of the drums the pride and disgrace" refers to the JFK assassination and the marching band as his casket was carried to Arlington cemetery.
 "Hate your next door neighbor but don't forget to say grace" refers to simple hypocrisy, according to Sloan.

Barry McGuire version 
McGuire's recording was made between July 12 and July 15, 1965, and released by Dunhill Records. The accompanying musicians were top-tier Los Angeles session players: P. F. Sloan on guitar, Hal Blaine (of the Wrecking Crew) on drums, and Larry Knechtel on bass guitar. The vocal track was thrown on as a rough mix and was not intended to be the final version, but a copy of the recording "leaked" out to a disc jockey, who began playing it. The song was an instant hit, and as a result, the more polished vocal track that was at first envisioned was never recorded.

McGuire recalled in later years that "Eve of Destruction" had been recorded in one take on a Tuesday morning, reading lyrics scrawled on a crumpled piece of paper. The following Monday morning he got a phone call from the record company at 7:00 am, telling him to turn on the radio — his song was playing. McGuire's single hit #1 on the US Billboard Hot 100 and #3 on the UK Singles Chart in September 1965.

Reception
In the first week of its release, the single was at No. 103 on the Billboard charts. By August 12 Dunhill released the LP, Eve of Destruction. It reached its peak of #37 on the Billboard album chart during the week ending September 25. That same day the single went to #1 on the chart, and repeated the feat on the Cashbox chart, where it had debuted at No. 30. McGuire would never again break into the top 40 of the Billboard Hot 100. It went to #1 in Norway for two weeks.

Chart history

Weekly charts

Year-end charts

Controversy, parodies, and response songs 
In addition to its being banned in some parts of the U.S., it was also banned by Radio Scotland. It was placed on a "restricted list" by the BBC, and could not be played on "general entertainment programmes". It was however featured on Top of the Pops on television one week while in the Top 10.

A group called The Spokesmen released a partial parody and answer record entitled "The Dawn of Correction". This became a Top 40 hit. Singer Tony Mammarella also released a positive answer song titled "Eve of Tomorrow". That song did not make the pop charts. A few months later, Green Beret medic SSgt. Barry Sadler released the patriotic "Ballad of the Green Berets". Johnny Sea's 1966 spoken word recording, "Day For Decision", was also a response to the song, and was also a Top 40 hit. In addition the British musician Alan Klein wrote and performed a parody and attack on folk-singers such as Donovan and Bob Dylan entitled "Age of Corruption", using the same melody as Sloan's song, on his album Well at Least It's British.

In popular culture
 
The Temptations' song "Ball of Confusion (That's What the World Is Today)" mentions the song title.

The song is prominently featured in the second season episode of The Greatest American Hero, entitled "Operation Spoilsport." The aliens who gave Ralph the supersuit play it on the radio to motivate Ralph to shut down the missile launch.

The song is played during the fourth-season finale of The A-Team, "The Sound of Thunder," when the team returns to Vietnam and flashbacks recall their tours of duty.

The song, like many other popular songs of the day, gave its name to a gun truck used by United States Army Transportation Corps forces during the Vietnam War. The truck is on display at the U.S. Army Transportation Museum and is believed to be the only surviving example of a Vietnam era gun truck.

The song is featured in the soundtrack of Mafia III.

The song is played in its entirety in the Italian film Rose Island from 2020.

An extract of the song is played by Larry Underwood in the 1994 television adaption of Stephen King's The Stand, symbolizing the end of civilization that occurs in the story.

See also
Civil rights movement in popular culture
List of anti-war songs

References

External links
MerseySide itunes link
Barry McGuire Homepage

1965 singles
1965 songs
Anti-war songs
Barry McGuire songs
The Screaming Jets songs
Billboard Hot 100 number-one singles
Cashbox number-one singles
Dunhill Records singles
RCA Victor singles
Jan and Dean songs
Number-one singles in Norway
Protest songs
RPM Top Singles number-one singles
Song recordings produced by Lou Adler
Songs about nuclear war and weapons
Songs against racism and xenophobia
Songs of the Vietnam War
Songs written by P. F. Sloan
The Turtles songs